Cosimo Pinto (born 14 March 1943) is a retired Italian light heavyweight boxer who won a gold medal at the 1964 Olympics. Contrary to most of his teammates he remained an amateur and later won a bronze medal at the 1967 European championships.

1964 Olympic record
Below are the results of Cosimo Pinto, an Italian light heavyweight boxer who competed at the 1964 Olympics in Tokyo:

 Round of 32: bye
 Round of 16: defeated Rudie Lubbers  (Netherlands) by decision, 5-0
 Quarterfinal: defeated Jurgen Schlegel (Unified Team of Germany) by decision, 4-1
 Semifinal: defeated Alexander Nicolov (Bulgaria) referee stopped contest
 Final: defeated Aleksei Kiselyov (Soviet Union) by decision, 3-2 (won gold medal)

References

1943 births
Light-heavyweight boxers
Living people
Olympic boxers of Italy
Boxers at the 1964 Summer Olympics
Olympic gold medalists for Italy
Olympic medalists in boxing
Medalists at the 1964 Summer Olympics
Italian male boxers
People from Novara
Sportspeople from the Province of Novara
Mediterranean Games gold medalists for Italy
Mediterranean Games medalists in boxing
Competitors at the 1963 Mediterranean Games
20th-century Italian people